Armijo High School is a public secondary school located in Fairfield, California, United States. It is the oldest of the three high schools in the Fairfield-Suisun Unified School District, the other two being Fairfield High School and Angelo Rodriguez High School. It is named after the Armijo family, who purchased one of the original six land grants in Solano County awarded to General Mariano Vallejo.  The school serves about 2600 students in grades 9 to 12 from the central part of Fairfield and Suisun City.

The school started in 1891 with 30 students in a single classroom located in the Crystal Elementary School building. In 1893, a separate wooden building was built for use as the high school. In 1915, the school moved to a large stone building on Union Avenue in downtown Fairfield that is now used as the Solano County courthouse. It stayed there for nearly 50 years until construction was completed in 1964 on a newer facility located on Washington Street, roughly two blocks from the Union Avenue location. In 2019, the Fairfield-Suisun School District board voted unanimously to replace the "Armijo Indian" mascot. As of 2020, the school's mascot is "The Royals".

Notable alumni 
Robert E. "Rufus" Bowen (1964), Mathematician
Johnny Colla (1967), Huey Lewis and the News Saxophonist/Guitarist
Huck Flener (1985), Major League Baseball player
Luis Grijalva (2017), professional runner representing Guatemala; Olympian
Robert F. Hale (1964), Undersecretary of Defense (Comptroller)
George Martin (1971), National Football League player
Pat Morita (1947) Film actor who portrayed Mr. Miyagi.
Phaedra Ellis-Lamkins (1983), American sustainability advocate and CEO of the anti-poverty organization Green For All.
Doug Martin (1976), National Football League Minnesota Vikings

References 

Educational institutions established in 1891
High schools in Solano County, California
International Baccalaureate schools in California
Public high schools in California
Fairfield, California
1891 establishments in California